Hirama (written: 平間) is a Japanese surname. Notable people with the surname include:

, Japanese footballer
, Japanese musician and composer
, Japanese footballer

See also
Hirama Station, a railway station in Kanagawa Prefecture, Japan

Japanese-language surnames